Halichoeres kallochroma is a species of salt water wrasse found in the Eastern Indian Ocean.

Size

References

kallochroma
Taxa named by Pieter Bleeker
Fish described in 1853